Mary McLaughlin Craig (1889–1964) was an architect, working throughout California despite her lack of formal training as a proponent of the Spanish Colonial style. The archive of her correspondence, specifications, drawings, notes, and photographs was acquired in 1976 by the Art, Design, & Architecture Museum at the University of California, Santa Barbara as part of the Architecture and Design Collection.

Biography 
Born in Deadwood, South Dakota, she moved to Pasadena in 1913. In 1919, she married architect James Osborne Craig. They worked together as architects in Santa Barbara until the time of his death, at which point she facilitated ongoing work on the projects and subsequently developed her own architectural practice focused mainly on residential works of architecture.

Works

See also
 List of California women architects

References 

1889 births
1964 deaths
American women architects